Qiñwani (Aymara qiñwa, qiwña a kind of tree  (polylepis), -ni a suffix, "the one with the qiwña tree", also spelled Khenwani) is a mountain in the Andes of Bolivia which reaches a height of approximately . It is situated in the La Paz Department, José Manuel Pando Province, Catacora Municipality. Qiñwani lies at the Peruvian border, west of the Junt'uni Jawira.

References 

Mountains of La Paz Department (Bolivia)